Soveychti or Soveycheti may refer to:
 Soveychti 1
 Soveychti 2
 Soveychti 3